Goldenhersh is a surname. Notable people with the surname include: 

 Heather Goldenhersh (born 1973), American actress
 Joseph H. Goldenhersh (1914–1992), American jurist
 Josh Goldenhersh, American musician